Tegulidae is a family of small to large sea snails, marine gastropod mollusks in the superfamily Trochoidea (according to the taxonomy of the Gastropoda by Bouchet & Rocroi, 2005).

This was for a long time considered to be a subfamily (Tegulinae) within the family Turbinidae.

Genera 
Genera within the family Tegulidae include:
 Agathistoma Olsson & Harbison, 1953
 Callistele Cotton & Godfrey, 1935
 Carolesia Güller & Zelaya, 2014
 Cittarium Philippi, 1847
 Norrisia Bayle, 1880
 Rochia Gray, 1857
 Tectus Montfort, 1810
 Tegula Lesson, 1832
Genera brought into synonymy
 Cardinalia Gray, 1842: synonym of Tectus Montfort, 1810
 Chlorostoma Swainson, 1840: synonym of Tegula Lesson, 1832 (junior synonym)
 Livona Gray, 1842: synonym of Cittarium Philippi, 1847
 Meleagris Montfort, 1810: synonym of Cittarium Philippi, 1847 (invalid: not Meleagris Linnaeus, 1758 [Aves]; Cittarium is a replacement name)
 Neomphalius P. Fischer, 1885: synonym of Tegula Lesson, 1832 (unnecessary substitute name for Omphalius Philippi, 1847, by Fischer treated as a junior homonym of Omphalia de Haan, 1825)
 Omphalius Philippi, 1847: synonym of Tegula Lesson, 1832
 Promartynia Dall, 1909: synonym of Tegula  Lesson, 1832
 Pyramidea Swainson, 1840: synonym of Tectus Montfort, 1810
 Pyramis Schumacher, 1817: synonym of Tectus Montfort, 1810
 Trochiscus G. B. Sowerby I, 1838: synonym of Norrisia Bayle, 1880

References 

 Bouchet P., Rocroi J.P., Hausdorf B., Kaim A., Kano Y., Nützel A., Parkhaev P., Schrödl M. & Strong E.E. (2017). Revised classification, nomenclator and typification of gastropod and monoplacophoran families. Malacologia. 61(1-2): 1-526